John Anstruther Berners (23 September 1869 – 2 March 1934) was an English first-class cricketer active 1904 who played for Middlesex. He was born in Westminster; died in Suffolk.

References

1869 births
1934 deaths
English cricketers
Middlesex cricketers
Gentlemen of England cricketers
Suffolk cricketers